Fatehpur is a city in the state of Uttar Pradesh, India. The city is situated between the rivers Ganga and Yamuna. The city has been named after Babu Fateh Chandra who helped Rani Lakshmi Bai in freedom fight as well.

Geography
It has an average elevation of 110 metres (360 feet). This district is situated between two important cities - Allahabad and Kanpur - of Uttar Pradesh. It is well connected with those cities by train route as well as bus route. It lies in fertile land also known as 'Doaba' between Ganges and Yamuna. National Highway 19(NH-19) goes through the city. It is the junction for going to Banda, Prayagraj, Kanpur and Raebareli.

Climate

History
The known history of Fatehpur is as old as the Vedic era. Alexander Cunningham has written about "Bhitaura" and "Asani" places of this district, while discussing about the residuals of the Vedic era. There are proofs that Chinese traveller Huen Tsang visited the Asani place of this district.

Many articles like coins, bricks, idols etc. of the Maurya period, Kushan period and Gupta period have been found throughout the area, which are very important from the archaeological point of view. Golden coins of period of Chandragupta II have been recovered from village Bijauli. The bricks used in the fort of Asani are also of the Gupta Period.
The Khajuha town, situated on Mughal road is a very old town. Its description has been found in the old Hindu scripture "Brahma Purana". Mahmud Ghaznavi is reported to have captured Fatehpur during his campaigns against the Gahadavala dynasty. In 1561 AD, Mughal emperor Humayun passed through this town while invading Jaunpur Sultanate. On 5 January 1659, Mughal emperor Aurangzeb had a fierce battle with his brother prince Shah Shuja and defeated him near this place, forcing him to flee to Burma. To celebrate the victory, he constructed a large beautiful garden "Badshahi Bagh" and a big lodge having 130 rooms.

During the Mughal regime, the control of Fatehpur shifted over time to the hands of Jaunpur, Delhi and Kannauj. In 1801, this region came under control of the East India Company, and in 1814 it was given the status of a sub-division (Paragana), while the headquarters were at Bhitaura, which is now a block office. In 1826, Fatehpur was re-designated as a district headquarters.

Demographics
 census, Fatehpur City had a great population of 193,193 out of which males were 101,263 and females were 91,930. The literacy rate was 76.50 per cent. Bahuwa Town had a population of 11,031 with 69.67% literacy rate. There are 528 villages in Fatehpur Tehsil with population of 892,229 with 65.51% literacy rate. Fatehpur is lack of inter industrialisation large number of people prefer to migrate different cities or abroad for better working opportunities. The city has enough educational institutions but no single educational institution are offering the jobs fairs or placing the students at different sectors.

Notable people
VP Singh, the 7th prime minister of India, was elected to Parliament from Fatehpur.
Sohan Lal Dwivedi, the great national poet of India
Ganesh Shankar Vidyarthi
Sadhvi Niranjan Jyoti, Minister of State for Food Processing Industries in Modi 1.0 Government.

Transport

Airways
Kanpur Airport is the nearest airport which is about 70 kilometres away. Allahabad Airport is the second nearest airport about 117 kilometres away.

Railways
Fatehpur railway station serves the city and is on the Howrah-Delhi main line. This is an A-Category railway station under the North Central Railway zone.

Roadways
Fatehpur has inter state bus station. NH 19 bypasses the city. NH 232 also passes through the city.

References

 
Cities in Uttar Pradesh